Madison Township is a civil township in the northwestern part of Rockingham County, North Carolina, United States. It is named for James Madison.

Townships in Rockingham County, North Carolina